Teocaltiche ( "place near the temple") is a town and municipality in the central-western Mexican state of Jalisco. It is located in the northeastern highlands region of Jalisco, commonly referred to in Spanish as "Los Altos de Jalisco".  The grasshopper or "chapulin" is a popular icon for the town.

The town is also known for its tourism, for example, the "Hospital de los Indios" (or alternatively "la Capilla") is a chapel in the city centre and the oldest standing building of Teocaltiche, built approximately in the year 1546 by the Spanish conquistadors. Teocaltiche   is one of the oldest settlements with Hispanic influence from the time of the Spanish conquest.  The territory was conquered by Cristóbal de Oñate and Manuel de Ibarra in March 1530 on the order of  Nuño de Guzmán.

Industry 
Main manufacture of the region is agricultural products and livestock.  The farmers raise horses, cows, sheep, pigs, poultry, and goats.  Agriculture includes the production of onions, corn, oats, beans, and alfalfa. There are also many artisans that sell hand-crafted goods, such as woven serapes and chess sets.

Notable people from Teocaltiche
 Ángel Alonzo, Mexican footballer (Club Necaxa, Liga MX)
 José Guadalupe Cruz, Mexican comics writer and screenwriter
 Mario Díaz Pérez, Mexican football manager and former football player
 Victoriano Salado Álvarez, Mexican writer and politician
 Roberto Sánchez, Mexican hurdler
 Carlos Manuel Villalobos Organista, Mexican politician

Government

Municipal presidents

References

External links 
 Teocaltiche travel
 Tourism site
 Government site
 Tourism social network

Municipalities of Jalisco